Bae Jin-young (born February 19, 1993), better known by her stage name Punch, is a South Korean singer. She is best known for her original soundtracks for various TV series, notably "Sleepless Night" for It's Okay, That's Love (2014), "Everytime" for Descendants of the Sun (2016) with Exo member Chen and "Stay with Me" for Guardian: The Lonely and Great God (2016) with Exo member Chanyeol.

Discography

Extended plays

Singles

Filmography

Music videos

TV/Variety programs

Awards and nominations

References

1993 births
Living people
South Korean women pop singers
South Korean hip hop singers
21st-century South Korean women singers